The Zamzam Well is a well located within the Masjid al-Haram in Mecca, Saudi Arabia.

According to Islamic narratives, the well is a miraculously generated source of water, which opened up thousands of years ago when the son of Ibrahim (Abraham), Ismaʿil (Ishmael), was left with his mother Hajar (Hagar) in the desert. It is claimed to have dried up during the settlement of the Jurhum in the area and to have been rediscovered in the 6th century by ʿAbd al-Muṭṭalib, grandfather of Muhammad. Millions of pilgrims visit the well each year while performing the Hajj or Umrah pilgrimages in order to drink its water.

Etymology 
The origin of the name is uncertain. According to Chabbi the noun  is an onomatopoeia.

She states that this latter meaning of an unintelligible guttural sound encompasses a layer of meaning associated with the sacred and mystical, in addition to the basic notion of the sound possibly being related to the concept of an abundant flow of water.

The terms are onomatopoeic and derive from what Arabs perceived to be an indistinct, droning sound of the recitation of Avestan prayers and scriptures by Magi.

They argue that based on their "kinship with Abraham" Zoroastrians regularly made pilgrimages to Mecca to pray over the well. A later account by al-ʿAynī claims that the well is named after  supposedly meaning "bridles" which had been donated to the well by and named after Sasan, the Zoroastrian progenitor of the Sasanian Empire.

Other mediaeval Arabic sources connect the name to the Angel Gabriel being the source of the murmuring being captured by this onomatopoeia.

Hughes additionally identifies a tradition of deriving the name from an exclamation supposedly made by Hajar either being   or supposedly Egyptian meaning "Stop, stop!".

Traditional accounts

Traditional Origins 

Islamic tradition states that the Zamzam Well was opened up in some form by God to assist Hajar, the second wife of Ibrahim and mother of Ismaʿil. In Islamic narratives Ibrahim, commanded by God, led Hajar and Ismaʿil to the area of present-day Mecca, there he left them alone in the desert. The two are narrated to have been suffering severely from thirst. In some versions of the story Hajar walks back and forth between the two hills of Safa and Marwah in search of water. The story of the appearance of the well either involves the infant Isma'il scraping the ground with his feet and water springing out or God sending Gabriel (Jibra'il) who consequently opens up the well using a variety of methods depending on the narration. The wealth of mystic discourses discussing the history of the well is from the Abbasid era and largely extra-Quranic, as the well is not referred to directly by the Quran.

According to Islamic tradition, Ibrahim rebuilt a shrine called   near the site of the well. A building supposedly first constructed by Adam, which Muslim tradition regards as the origin of the Kaʿba. The well is meant to have dried up (possibly as punishment) during the settlement of the tribe of the Jurhum, who initially are meant to have migrated to the area from Yemen. In some narrations focused on the objects deposited in Zamzam the well simply dries up, then prior to the Jurhum being forced to leave Mecca because of God expelling them for their misdeeds their leader buries sacred objects from the Kaʿba in the location of Zamzam. In others, focused on the well itself, the objects are placed in Zamzam itself, with the well ultimately being buried by the leader of the Jurhum.

Traditional rediscovery 
According to traditional Muslim accounts, ʿAbd al-Muṭṭalib, grandfather of Muhammad, is responsible for the rediscovery of the well. He supposedly had a divine precognition about the well at some point in his life. A common narrative relayed by Ibn Ishaq via Ibn Hisham involves four dreams, the first three concern mysterious objects called   and  he is meant to dig for, the fourth then names Zamzam. Other accounts omit the third dream naming . Following ʿAbd al-Muṭṭalib's precognitions to dig, he is claimed to have found a number of artefacts: golden gazelle figurines, armour, and several specimina of a type of sword called . Ibn Saʿd relays two separate traditions regarding the discovery of a well by ʿAbd al-Muṭṭalib, one involving Zamzam's discovery and water disputes among the Quraysh, the other involving the series of dreams and said artefacts but neither water nor the name Zamzam.

Subsequent history 
Commentators of the Abbasid-era mystic discourses surrounding the well, like al-Masʿūdī expanded on these extra-Quranic accounts. They further connect the site to Zoroastrianism via what they interpret to be Zoroastrian religious artefacts uncovered by ʿAbd al-Muṭṭalib in combination with their etymological analyses. Ultimately arguing that due to the well's history supposedly being related to (what they perceive to have been) the true religion of the peoples of Iran, the Islamisation of Iran is to be understood and framed as a rediscovery.

The traditional Islamic account of the well's history relayed by al-Azraqī traces the lineage of its management via to Abū Tālib as inherited from its (re)-discoverer and his father ʿAbd al-Muṭṭalib. The usage rights to the well were then supposedly sold due to Abū Tālib's financial troubles to his brother, al-ʿAbbās, who is meant to have instituted the first new ordinance concerning the well by banning all non-religious body-hygienic uses of it. Thus the management of the Zamzam Well was reputedly a hereditary position of the Abbasids, ie the progeny of al-ʿAbbās, who ended up seizing control over Mecca as a whole using their caliphate. One of which is claimed to have been initially built on orders from and named after Abbas, founder of the Abbasid Dynasty himself. In the years 775-778 CE the second Abbasid caliph, al-Mansur, sponsored extensive construction projects in the Masjid al-Haram, which included paving the area around Zamzam with marble. Beginning in the years 833-855 CE, during the rule of al-Muʿtasim, a civil servant called ʿUmar ibn Faraǧ ar-Ruḫḫaǧī began a series of construction projects related to the well, all marked by their intricate use of mosaics. He ended up constructing a dome covering the well and demolishing a previous structure surrounding it. Additionally a dome connecting the new dome over the well and the House of Drinking was constructed. Ar-Ruḫḫaǧī had the House of Drinking demolished in 843-844 CE, during the rule of al-Wathiq, and went on to have three small domes surrounding the dome covering Zamzam built in its stead.

In the year 930 CE a branch of Ismaʿilism called the Qarmatians launched an attack on Mecca. They had previously attacked many caravans of the Abbasid Caliphate, including those of pilgrims travelling to the city. They would conquer the black stone and move it to the capital of their own Caliphate in Bahrayn for 22 years. They were briefly led in 931 by a Persian Caliph, al-Isfahani, whom they believed to be God incarnate who unsuccessfully attempted to convert the Qarmatian state to Zoroastrianism. They destroyed the dome covering Zamzam. It is relayed by historians such as  that in the aftermath of their attack on the city, the Well Zamzam, as well as all other wells in the city were filled with corpses of pilgrims.

Following the Abbasid relinquishment of the management of the well a quasi-guild called Zamzamis emerged and remained in place at least until the end of the 19th century. While theoretically anyone could go to the well and fill a vessel they brought at the well, in practice this group of specialised men ended up being primarily responsible for distributing the well's water. They did so by storing two kinds of filled jugs, some on wooden podiums with metal cups attached others hidden in the shade. They performed this service in theory without demanding payment. In 19th century practice however a pilgrim would be assigned a Zamzami upon his arrival and would have been obliged to pay him a small initial sum of $1 for a jug to bear his name. This jug would then be kept by the Zamzami for the pilgrim. Payment was in practice also expected for the further services of the Zamzami. These included bringing the pilgrim water throughout his pilgrimage and pouring it over his body for purposes of ritual cleaning (wudu) among others. To nudge the pilgrim into donating adequately the Zamzami would show the pilgrim the bad state of the prayer mats he laid out in the Masjid for the pilgrims and explain his dire need for donations. The more generous the pilgrim's donations were, the more expansive the Zamzamis services became; with services such as procuring bottled Zamzam water to be taken home after the pilgrimage and bringing jugs right to the pilgrim's abode in Mecca being reserved for the most generous. To be allowed into the trade of being a Zamzami a costly license from the Grand Sharif was required. During the reign of Awn ar-Rafiq as Grand Sharif for example such a license cost £50.

In the 15th century the Mamluk Sultan Qaitbay invested into improving the well's water quality, as well as funding the construction of a new dome covering the well. In 1489 CE, during the reign of Mamluk Sultan Malik an-Nāṣir, reconstruction of the Dome of Abbas, ie one of the two Domes of Drinking, occurred. There had been structures bearing this name and function again at least since 1183 CE. The new structure featured a large painted gate made from yellow stone, a large fountain in its middle, three iron windows, and two metal fountains for pilgrims to drink from all housed under a large dome. Following the Ottoman conquest of the Mamluk Sultanate and their assumption of power in Mecca, Suleiman the Magnificent funded many construction and renovation works in the city. One of these began in 1540 CE with the destruction of the roof covering the well, which had remained intact since Qaitbay's rule. While construction was disrupted by a flood, completion of the new roof occurred in January 1542 CE. In 1621 CE the Ottoman Sultan Ahmed I had an iron cage constructed around the well. In 1660 CE Ottoman authorities constructed a new building over Zamzam. Following their conquest of Mecca in 1803, during the reign of Selim III, the Wahhabis, led by Abdulaziz bin Muhammad Al Saud, destroyed the dome covering the well. In 1964 CE the last building covering the well of Zamzam, which had been rebuilt by Ottoman authorities following the destruction of the building housing Zamzam by the first Saudi State, was demolished by authorities of the third Saudi State (known at that time already as the Kingdom of Saudi Arabia). In its place the opening of the well was moved to a basement, 2.5 m deep, to free up space above ground for pilgrims.

Technical information 
It taps groundwater from the wadi alluvium and some from the bedrock. Historically water from the well was drawn via ropes and buckets, but since 1964 the well's opening itself is in a basement room inaccessible to the public, where it can be seen behind glass panels. Two electric pumps, operating alternately, move the water 5 km southwards at a pace of between 11 to 18.5 litres per second to the King Abdullah bin Abdulaziz Zamzam Water Project in Kudai. The center opened in September 2010 CE costing 700 million Saudi Riyal to construct and being operated by the National Water Company of Saudi Arabia. In this location treatment using filters and ultraviolet light, storage, and distribution take place. Once treated the water is stored in one of two reservoirs, the first at the plant's location in Kudai can hold 10,000 cubic meters of water, the other, the King Abdulaziz Sabeel Reservoir in Medina, has a larger capacity of 16,000 cubic meters. The Kudai location is connected via pipes to drinking fountains in the Masjid al-Haram. The Medina location supplies the Prophet’s Mosque. Aside from the system of pipes unbottled water is distributed using tanker trucks which transport 150,000 litres per day at normal times and up to 400,000 litres per day during pilgrimage seasons to the Medina location. Unbottled water is available through the before-mentioned drinking fountains, a fountain meant for pilgrims wishing to fill larger containers not intended for immediate consumption, and sterilised containers placed by authorities throughout the holy sites in Mecca and Medina. These latter containers come in several variants, chilled and unchilled, as well as being either stationary or worn as a backpack by employees of the complexes with disposable plastic cups provided in any case. Small filtered water bottles are also distributed free of charge at the holy sites. The water distributed this way in the Masjid al-Haram totals ca. 700,000 litres per day outside of pilgrimage season and 2,000,000 litres per day during said season. Distribution outside the Islamic holy sites within the Kingdom of Saudi Arabia occurs with the water being bottled in 10-litre-containers which are sold directly at a warehouse at the site of the King Abdullah bin Abdulaziz Zamzam Water Project or via hypermarkets and super stores throughout the state. In 2018 the number of 10-litre-containers distributed per day was 1.5 million. In 2010 the annual limit on how much water can be extracted from the well was stated as  500,000 cubic meters (500,000,000 litres per year), though due to annual variations in rainfall patterns there exists a lot of deviation with regards to how much water can be extracted without lowering the well's water level too drastically each year.

Hydrogeologically, the well is in the Wadi Ibrahim (Valley of Abraham). The upper half of the well is in the sandy alluvium of the valley, lined with stone masonry except for the top metre (3 ft) which has a concrete "collar". The lower half is in the bedrock. Between the alluvium and the bedrock is a  section of permeable weathered rock, lined with stone, and it is this section that provides the main water entry into the well. Water in the well comes from absorbed rainfall in the Wadi Ibrahim, as well as run-off from the local hills. Since the area has become more and more settled, water from absorbed rainfall on the Wadi Ibrahim has decreased.

The Saudi Geological Survey has a "Zamzam Studies and Research Centre" which analyses the technical properties of the well in detail. Water levels were monitored by hydrograph, which in more recent times has changed to a digital monitoring system that tracks the water level, electric conductivity, pH, Eh, and temperature. All of this information is made continuously available via the Internet. Other wells throughout the valley have also been established, some with digital recorders, to monitor the response of the local aquifer system.

Zamzam water is colourless and odorless, but has a distinctive taste, with a pH of 7.9–8, and so is slightly alkaline.

Safety of Zamzam water
The Zamzam Well is tested on a daily basis, in a process involving the taking of three samples from the well, and that these samples are examined in the King Abdullah Zamzam Water Distribution Center in Mecca, which is equipped with advanced facilities.

The Zamzam well was recently renovated in 2018 by the Saudi authorities. The project involved sterilisation of the areas around the Zamzam well by removing the debris of concrete and steel used in the old cellar of the Grand Mosque. During Ramadan, 100 samples are tested every day to ensure that the water is in good quality.

Historical controversy 
Cholera epidemics and the Hajj had become an issue of debate since a 1866 CE International Sanitary Conference in Istanbul. The conference however identified British steam-ships transporting Indian Muslims to the Hajj as mainly responsible for the globalisation of cholera. The Ottoman state consequently instituted a quarantine system using the Red Sea to protect public health. Britain tried to undermine this system in the coming decades fearing public backlash in India and restrictions on its ability to engage in free trade.

The first controversy surrounding the safety of water from the Zamzam Well began in 1883 CE. In 1881 CE, James Zohrab, British Consul in Jeddah sent samples of Zamzam water to Edward Frankland, who published his findings in 1883 CE. Frankland claimed the water from the well to be six times more contaminated by animal waste than sewage in London. Arguing that due to human waste being simply buried in the ground in Mecca, the groundwater had become highly contaminated and a source of cholera. This situation, coupled with the city's visitors from all around the Muslim world, is meant to have spread the disease effectively throughout it. He ultimately called for the closure of Zamzam as a public health measure to protect the people of Asia and Europe.

Frankland's report became the basis for a treatise presented to the Ottoman Board of Health by the Dutch emissary thereto. The treaty was received very negatively and interpreted to be anti-Islamic propaganda. Mehmed Şakir Bey, an epidemiologist, was so outraged that he consulted Bonkowsky Paşa, the Sultan's head chemist, and Ahmet Efendi, professor of chemistry at the Ottoman War College, for further scientific inquiry. Their testing revealed nothing dangerous about the water of Zamzam. By comparing their results to the results Frankland had published they began to publicly doubt the authenticity of his sample, as his sample was almost as saline as sea water. Additionally they explained that the water in Mecca's aqueducts and that from Zamzam came from entirely different sources, that pilgrims did not so much as bathe near the Masjid al-Haram, and that Zamzam could not be a cholera source because Mecca did not see annual cholera epidemics during the Hajj.

Related to their doubts of the water's authenticity they began to speculate that Yusuf Kudzi, a British protected person and associate of Zohrab, had been the source of the water and had contaminated the water to embarrass the Muslim world. Kudzi was of Russian-Jewish ancestry, he had been born in Jerusalem and was a convert to Islam. The Ottoman establishment of that time had grown to doubt the authenticity of any Muslim cooperating with the British, conceptualising them as not truly Muslim and possibly as being spies.

Britain's intellectuals ended up rejecting Robert Koch's (presently widely accepted) findings of cholera being caused by bacteria. They kept arguing that cholera must be caused by local factors and in a manner which cannot be mediated via quarantine. British scientists would continue publishing anti-Zamzam and anti-contagionist articles up to 1895 CE. Their anti-contagionist views would fall further and further away from scientific consensus in the following decades. Concurrently Ottoman authorities continued to invest into persistent and successful efforts seeking to maintain and improve water quality throughout Arabia.

BBC allegation and responses
In May 2011 CE, a BBC London investigation alleged that water taken from taps connected to the Zamzam Well contained high levels of nitrate and arsenic at levels three times the legal limit in the UK, the same levels found in illegal water purchased in the UK.

Saudi Arabian authorities' claim
The Saudi authorities rejected the BBC's claim and said that the water is fit for human consumption. An official from the Saudi Arabian embassy in London stated: "...water from the Zamzam well is not contaminated and is fit for human consumption. Genuine Zamzam water does not contain arsenic." The president of the Saudi Geological Survey (SGS), Zuhair Nawab, has stated that the Zamzam Well is tested on a daily basis, in a process involving the taking of three samples from the well.

The BBC article concentrated on bottled water supplied by individuals rather than the Presidency of the Two Holy Mosques' Affairs, according to Fahd Turkistani, advisor to the General Authority of Meteorology and Environmental Protection. Turkistani stated that the Zamzam water pollution may have been caused by unsterilized containers used by illegal workers selling Zamzam water at Makkah gates.

Council of British Hajjis
In the same month that the BBC report was released, the Council of British Hajjis later declared that drinking Zamzam water was safe, contradicting the BBC report. The council noted that the Government of Saudi Arabia does not allow the export of Zamzam water for resale. They also stated that it was unknown whether the water being sold in the UK was genuine and that people should not buy it and should report the sellers to the Trading Standards if they saw it for sale.

See also 
 List of reduplicated place names

Footnotes

Notes

References 
 

Holy wells
Hajj
Islamic pilgrimages
Springs of Saudi Arabia
Masjid al-Haram
Abraham in Islam
Hagar